Lane v Holder (District case 1:1 lcv503, Appellate case 11-1847) is a civil lawsuit filed with the United States District Court for the Eastern District of Virginia on behalf of plaintiff Michelle Lane, a resident of the District of Columbia, by the Second Amendment Foundation against Eric Holder, Attorney General for the United States, and W. Steven Flaherty, Superintendent of the Virginia State Police. The suit seeks to bar the Defendants from enforcing a provision of the Federal Gun Control Act of 1968 that prohibits the purchase of firearms by a non-resident of the state in which the purchase is made, and from enforcing a Virginia State statute prohibiting the sale of handguns, outright, to any non-resident of the State. The case was dismissed by the District Court judge Gerald Bruce Lee. An appeal by Lane and the SAF is pending before the Fourth Circuit Court of Appeals.

The case is notable as being a direct challenge to a major provision of Federal firearms law, on which a large number of State statutes are effectively based. If the plaintiffs succeed, residents of any State will be able to buy any handgun that can be legally sold in any other State and take possession of it directly, regardless of any law that may prohibit sales or purchase, but not ownership, of that type of weapon.

Background
Michelle Lane, a US citizen and resident of the District of Columbia, sought to purchase two handguns from a firearms dealer in Virginia in April 2011. Ms. Lane is not a person legally prohibited from owning a firearm under Federal law, and prior to making the order, she confirmed with DC Metro police that the firearms would be legal for her to possess within the District.

US Code Title 18, Section 922, as amended by the Gun Control Act of 1968, prohibits a Federal Firearms License (FFL) holder from selling a firearm to a non-resident of the state in which the purchase occurred, except that a dealer may sell a firearm to a resident of a State where the FFL holder does not maintain a place of business. In that situation, the FFL holder must first transfer the firearm to an FFL holder that does business within the purchaser's home state, who may then transfer it to the purchaser. For the purposes of this law, the District of Columbia is considered a "state".

However, due largely to the District of Columbia's high level of restriction on firearms in general, there are currently no FFL holders doing business within the District of Columbia. The sole FFL holder that was formerly available within that jurisdiction, Mr. Charles Sykes, lost the lease on his place of business within D.C. and is thus currently barred from transferring firearms into that jurisdiction. As such, as of the filing of the suit, Ms. Lane has no way to legally transfer the firearm into D.C. and thus take possession of it.

In addition, Virginia Code Section 18.2-308.2:2 bars any firearms dealer from selling a handgun to a non-resident of the State of Virginia. The law does not prohibit the sale of "long guns"; rifles and shotguns. The law also allows for the purchase of handguns by an out-of-state FFL holder, who would then be able to resell the firearm in their state or jurisdiction. However, again, the District of Columbia has no such FFL holder currently doing business.

The suit was filed on May 10, 2011, stating that the Virginia statute and the Federal law injure Ms Lane, and all residents of D.C., by making it impossible to purchase a handgun, in violation of the Second Amendment to the United States Constitution. Plaintiffs seek relief in the form of a preliminary injunction barring the Defendants and the agencies they control from enforcing the laws in question.

District Court Motion For Dismissal
In documents filed by the Defendants and substantiated by the amici curiae Attorney General for the District of Columbia, Thomas Koger, Defendants claimed that the issue prompting the suit, namely the lack of an FFL holder to which to transfer firearms, is not under the direct control of the Defendants, and further is being addressed with all speed by providing Mr. Sykes (and other FFL holders) a space within the Metropolitan Police Department within which to conduct his firearms transfer business. Mr. Koger asserts that Ms. Lane will soon regain the ability to transfer firearms into the District.

On June 15, 2011, subsequent to an oral hearing, District Judge Gerald Bruce Lee denied the Plaintiffs' motion for injunction, simultaneously granting Defendants' motion to dismiss. The Court stated that, while the Plaintiffs would prevail on merits of the case, the issue was whether the Plaintiffs have standing to bring suit against the Defendants. The Court reasoned that the Defendants named in the suit were in fact not directly responsible for the injury suffered my Ms. Lane in not being able to procure a firearm; neither Eric Holder nor Stephen Flaherty are to blame for the lack of FFL holders in the District of Columbia, and were there FFL holders in the District, as amici curiae asserted there soon would be, Plaintiffs would have no argument.

Appeal to Fourth Circuit
Plaintiffs filed notice to appeal on July 29, 2011. On August 10, 2011, the case was assigned to the docket of the Fourth Circuit Court of Appeals as case 11-1847, Lane v. Holder. Oral arguments were scheduled for October 23, 2012. 

Appellants (the SAF and Ms. Lane) asserted that they do indeed have standing to bring suit against Holder and Flaherty, as reasoned by the Fourth Circuit in a related case, Dearth v. Holder, concerning a US citizen living in Canada who cannot purchase a firearm from a US dealer because he has no state of residence, as required by the ATF's implementation of the same law challenged in Lane. The fact remains, Appellants state, that Ms. Lane still cannot transfer the firearms purchased in Virginia into D.C., in part because of a law enforced under Eric Holder's Department of Justice that requires an FFL within the jurisdiction, and so Appellants assert Ms. Lane's injury is ongoing, and thus she does have standing, as found in the appellate decision in Dearth, to pursue the preliminary injunction against Mr. Holder. 

In addition, Appellants noted that the Virginia law applies only to handguns, and had Ms. Lane attempted to purchase a rifle instead of a handgun, the Virginia law would be no barrier. Alan Gura stated in his appellate brief, "Defendants fail to explain why the ability to understand and follow gun laws is proportional to barrel length." As the Virginia law, coupled with the lack of FFLs, is a contributing factor, Appellants also asserted standing to sue for an injunction against the Virginia law.

References

United States lawsuits